The R285 road is a regional road in Ireland linking the N4 at a point east of Boyle, County Roscommon to the R280 at Mountallen. The road lies entirely within County Roscommon.

En route it passes through Knockvicar and Keadue.

See also
Roads in Ireland
National primary road
National secondary road

References
Roads Act 1993 (Classification of Regional Roads) Order 2006 – Department of Transport

Regional roads in the Republic of Ireland
Roads in County Roscommon